Sabin William Carr (September 4, 1904 in Dubuque, Iowa – September 12, 1983 in Santa Barbara, California) was an American athlete who competed in the men's pole vault.  He competed in Athletics at the 1928 Summer Olympics in Amsterdam and won gold.
In 1927, Sabin Carr set new indoor and outdoor world records. In early February he took the indoor record up to 13-7⅛ (4.14), which he improved one week later to 13-9¼ (4.19). In May, at the IC4A outdoor, he became the first man to clear 14 feet (4.27), then in 1928, at the AAU indoor, he vaulted 14-1 (4.29) to become the first to clear 14 feet indoors. In 1928, Carr lost his world outdoor record to the 1924 Olympic champion, Lee Barnes, but at the Olympics, Carr got his revenge – he took the gold medal, with Barnes finishing fifth. Carr, a Yale graduate, had a fine record in major championships, winning the AAU indoor twice, the IC4A outdoor three times, and the IC4A indoor twice. Oddly he never placed better than third at the AAU outdoor meet. Carr eventually went into the lumber business in Oakland, California, and became president of the Sterling Lumber Co.

1904 births
1983 deaths
Athletes (track and field) at the 1928 Summer Olympics
American male pole vaulters
Sportspeople from Dubuque, Iowa
Track and field athletes from Iowa
Olympic gold medalists for the United States in track and field
The Hill School alumni
Medalists at the 1928 Summer Olympics
Yale Bulldogs men's track and field athletes
Burials at Santa Barbara Cemetery